The Queen Anne Hotel is a hotel in San Francisco, on Sutter Street. The hotel is a historic 1890 Victorian mansion, in the namesake Queen Anne architectural style, and decorated in the painted lady style. It was originally a girl's boarding school. It narrowly survived the 1906 San Francisco earthquake.

Haunting 
The hotel is a popular site for ghost hunting. The headmistress of the former finishing school, Mary Lake, is said to haunt her former office in Room 410. The hotel's paranormal history was explored in an episode of the television show Haunted Hotels.

See also
List of hotels in San Francisco

References

External links

Hotels in San Francisco
Hotel buildings completed in 1890
Queen Anne architecture in California
Reportedly haunted locations in San Francisco
1890 establishments in California